Imperial Japanese rations were the field rations issued by Imperial Japan in World War II, and which reflected the culture of the Japanese military. Rations had to be stout, durable, simple, sturdy and had to survive without refrigeration for long periods of time.  Typically each ration was served in the field in tin boxes, and cooked near the battlefield. The mess tin was known as a han-gou.

The rations issued by the Imperial Japanese Government, usually consisted of rice with barley, meat or fish, vegetables, pickled vegetables, umeboshi, shoyu sauce, miso or bean paste, and green tea. A typical field ration would have 1½ cups of rice, with barley. The reason why rice was issued with barley was to combat nutritional deficiencies such as beriberi. Often, soldiers would forage for fresh fruit to provide vitamins.

Typically ¼ cup of canned tuna, or sausages, and/or squid would be cooked from either captured locations or hunting in the nearby area.  Preserved foods from Japan typically were issued sparingly. Other foods issued: 1 ¼ cups of canned cabbage, coconut, sweet potato, burdock, lotus root, taro, bean sprouts, peaches, mandarin oranges, lychee or beans. 3 teaspoons of pickled radish (typically daikon), pickled cucumber, umeboshi, scallions and ginger added flavor to the rations. Sometimes less than an ounce of dried seaweed, was issued for making onigiri in the field, or beer and/or sake was issued to help boost morale.

Field rations 

Two types of rations were issued, normal rations for use at mealtimes and special rations to be carried by the soldier.

Normal ration 
A single ration of this type included the following:

 660 g (23.28 oz) of rice
 209 g (7.37 oz) of barley
 209 g (7.37 oz) of raw meat
 600 g (21.16 oz) of vegetables
 60 g (2.11 oz) of pickles
 small quantities of flavoring, salt, and sugar

Special ration 
A single ration included the following:

 580 g (20.46 oz) of rice (probably polished)
 230 g (8.113 oz) of biscuits
 150 g (5.3 oz) of canned meat (or 60 g (2.1 oz) of dried meat)
 120 g (4.23 oz) of dried vegetables
 31 g (1.09 oz) of dried plums, and small quantities of salt, sugar, and sometimes a can of beer or sake

Emergency rations 

Five days worth of rations were issued to each soldier for emergency use. The ration consisted of:

 Small sack of rice
 Package of compact food
 Package of hardtack
 Can of tea
 Half a pound of hard candy
 Vitamin pills

During the Burma campaign, the Japanese used two types of emergency rations. One was known as the "A" scale and the other as the "B" scale. Each soldier carried rations for three days on the "A" scale and for one day on the "B" scale. Neither of the rations was to be eaten except on orders of the commanding officer when the unit was separated from its supply column. Each ration under the "A" scale consisted of about 1 pound and 3 ounces of rice (enough for two meals) and one small can of mixed beef and vegetables. The soldier usually cooked the rice in a small bucket which he carried for this purpose. The "B" scale ration consisted of three paper bags of hard biscuits (enough for three meals).

See also
Bento
Canned food

References

Imperial Japanese Army
Japanese cuisine
Military food